Zheng Yunlong (born 27 June 1990) is a Chinese actor and singer. He has appeared in a few Chinese musicals.

Biography

Zheng was born in Qingdao, Shandong and graduated from Beijing Dance Academy.

Zheng's enthusiasm with stage performance comes from his mother, who is a Beijing Opera actress. He was inspired by the musical Cats, and decided to pursue a career in musical theater after graduation. His notable musical roles include the Chinese adaptations of Jekyll/Hyde in Jekyll & Hyde (musical), Quixote/Cervantes in Man of La Mancha, Stacee in Rock of Ages (musical), and Michael in Murder Ballad.

In August 2018, he won the Chinese Musical Academy Award for Best Male Actor. In November the same year, he participated in the singing competition reality show Super-Vocal and became well-known as one of the six final winners. He also appeared in the singing contest show Singer 2019 as a member of the Super-Vocal finalist group.

In March 2019, Zheng was recruited by Disney to sing the Mandarin version of the theme song "Baby Mine" for the fantasy adventure film Dumbo. In August, Zheng acted in a stage play, The Poetic Age, for the first time, and was awarded the Best New Talent in Lead Roles of the 30th Shanghai Magnolia Stage Awards.And since 2019, he has performed various leading roles in stage plays, including Emperor Guangxu in Deling and Cixi (2019 co-production of Tianjin People's Art Theatre and Hong Kong Repertory Theatre), Eben Cabot in Desire Under the Elms (2021 production of Beijing People's Art Theatre), and Frankenstein/Creature in Frankenstein (Chinese adaptation of 2011 British National Theatre production). 

Zheng made his movie debut in 2020, playing painter Gong Yushan in The Chanting Willows. The movie entered Main Competition Sector of the 24th Shanghai International Film Festival Golden Goblet Award. Zheng won the Best New Actor in the 2021 17th Chinese American Film Festival Golden Angel Award.

Starting in September 2022, he was hired for an acting role in Chinese version of stage play Frankenstein in Shanghai Grand Theater.

Theatre

Stage play

Musicals

Filmography

Film

Television series

Television show

Awards

Discography

Ambassador activities

References 

1990 births
Living people
Chinese male stage actors
21st-century Chinese male singers
Beijing Dance Academy alumni
Male actors from Qingdao
Singers from Shandong
Chinese male musical theatre actors